DSDM may refer to—
 Dubai School of Dental Medicine, a college in Dubai
 Dynamic systems development method, an agile project delivery framework